Branislav Pokrajac (27 January 1947 – 5 April 2018) was a Serbian handball coach and player who competed for Yugoslavia in the 1972 Summer Olympics and in the 1976 Summer Olympics.

Club career
At club level, Pokrajac made his debut with ORK Beograd, before moving to Crvena zvezda. He later played for and served as head coach of Dinamo Pančevo.

International career
At international level, Pokrajac competed for Yugoslavia in two Olympic tournaments, winning the gold medal in 1972. He also won two bronze medals at the World Championships (1970 and 1974).

Coaching career
In 1980, Pokrajac was appointed as head coach for Yugoslavia. He led the team to the Olympic gold medal in 1984.

References

External links
 Olympic record
 

1947 births
2018 deaths
Handball players from Belgrade
Serbian male handball players
Yugoslav male handball players
Olympic handball players of Yugoslavia
Olympic gold medalists for Yugoslavia
Handball players at the 1972 Summer Olympics
Handball players at the 1976 Summer Olympics
Olympic medalists in handball
Medalists at the 1972 Summer Olympics
Competitors at the 1967 Mediterranean Games
Competitors at the 1975 Mediterranean Games
Mediterranean Games gold medalists for Yugoslavia
Mediterranean Games medalists in handball
RK Crvena zvezda players
Serbian handball coaches
Yugoslav handball coaches
Handball coaches of international teams
Yugoslav expatriate sportspeople in Spain
Yugoslav expatriate sportspeople in France
Serbian expatriate sportspeople in Portugal